Arthur Cairns (7 April 1917 – 12 January 1992) was an Australian rules footballer who played for the St Kilda Football Club in the Victorian Football League (VFL).

Notes

External links 

1917 births
1992 deaths
Australian rules footballers from Victoria (Australia)
St Kilda Football Club players
Eaglehawk Football Club players